The Sri Taralabalu Jagadguru Institute of Technology (popularly known as STJIT) is a school of engineering situated in Ranibennur, a town in the northern Karnataka state of India. The college is affiliated with Visveswaraiah Technological University (VTU), and courses conducted by it are recognized by All India Council for Technical Education (AICTE) in New Delhi.

Situated on the outskirts of the town, the college campus includes a bank, hostel facilities for its students, libraries, computer labs, classrooms, and cricket and football fields.

References

External links
 Official website

All India Council for Technical Education
Engineering colleges in Karnataka
Affiliates of Visvesvaraya Technological University
Universities and colleges in Haveri district
Educational institutions in India with year of establishment missing